Diaphanes is a genus of fireflies in the Lampyrinae subfamily. Species within this genus are:

 D. citrinus
 D. exsanguis
 D. formosus
 D. guttatus
 D. lampyroides
 D. limbatus
 D. marginella
 D. mendax
 D. nubilus
 D. pectinealis

References 

Lampyridae genera
Bioluminescent insects